KFKK-LD (channel 32) is a low-power television station licensed to Stockton, California, United States, serving the Sacramento area as an affiliate of beIN Sports Xtra. It is owned by HC2 Holdings.

Technical information

Subchannels
The station's digital signal is multiplexed:

Former affiliations
KFKK-LD was affiliated with DrTV, a healthy-lifestyle specialty network that launched in the first quarter of 2014. The network ceased operations in 2019.

References

External links

FKK-LD
Television channels and stations established in 2016
Innovate Corp.
2016 establishments in California
Low-power television stations in the United States